The house mouse (Mus musculus) has a gestation period of 19 to 21 days. Key events in mouse brain development occur both before and after birth, beginning with peak neurogenesis of the cranial motor nuclei 9 days after conception, up to eye opening which occurs after birth and about 30 days after conception.

Stages in brain development

References 

Clancy, B., Kersh, B., Hyde, J., Darlington, R.B., Anand, K.J.S., Finlay, B.L., 2007. Web-Based Method For Translating Neurodevelopment From Laboratory Species To Humans. Neuroinformatics. 5, pp. 79–94.

See also 
 Brain development timelines
 Neural development
 http://www.translatingtime.net Translating Time: A website providing translation of brain developmental times among different species

Embryology of nervous system
Developmental neuroscience
Animal nervous system